Imperial Continental Gas Association plc was a leading British gas utility operating in various cities in Continental Europe. It was listed on the London Stock Exchange and was a constituent of the FTSE 100 Index.

History
The Company was formed by Sir Moses Montefiore and some of his colleagues based in London in 1824 as the Imperial Continental Gas Association to establish gas utilities in other counties. It commenced operations distributing gas in Hannover in 1825 and providing gas lighting in Berlin in 1826 under the supervision of the Prussian Count Eduard of Dyhrn-Waldenburg-Schoenau. During the course of the 19th century it established gas works in Antwerp, Brussels, Berlin and Vienna. Its operations in Vienna began in the mid-1840s; the head office from 1883 to 1902 was at the Palais Epstein.

Sir William Congreve, 2nd Baronet was general manager from 1824. The noted philanthropist Goodwin Newton of Barrells Hall, and Glencripesdale Estate was Director and Chairman for a long period in the late nineteenth century. In the early twentieth century Sir Henry Birchenough the future president of the British South Africa Company also served as a director of the company.

It established the Westergasfabriek gas works in Amsterdam in 1883.

In 1928 it established Distrigas, the main gas distributor in Belgium, which is now owned by Eni. During World War I its operations in Berlin were nationalised by the German Government.

In 1969 the Company acquired all the shares in Calor Group that it did not already own.

In 1986 it rejected a bid from Gulf Resources & Chemical Corporation, a company controlled by the Barclay brothers. Instead in 1987 it broke itself up into Calor Group (now owned by SHV) and Contibel (now owned by Tractebel).

References

Further reading 

 

Energy companies established in 1824
Companies formerly listed on the London Stock Exchange
Defunct companies based in London
Oil and gas companies of the United Kingdom
1824 establishments in England